Westerham Mines is a  biological Site of Special Scientific Interest south of Westerham in Kent.

The main interest of this site lies in the use of former mines by five species of bats for hibernation. They are the whiskered, Brandt's, Daubenton's, Natterer's and long-eared bats. Some moths also hibernate in the mines.

There is access to the site, but not the mines which are sealed off by grilles.

References

Sites of Special Scientific Interest in Kent
Westerham